Farhad Dejpasand (born 1962 in Rostamkola, is a politician, economist and former Minister of Economy of Iran.

External links
Official website

References 

1962 births
Living people
Iranian politicians
Government ministers of Iran